Pine Le Moray Provincial Park is a provincial park in British Columbia, Canada. It is located within the Hart Ranges ecosection near the Rocky Mountains. It is within the Engelmann Spruce-Subalpine Fir biogeoclimatic zone. Water courses include Link and Mountain Creeks, the Pine River, and Heart Lake. It provides habitat for trout, Arctic grayling, mountain whitefish, high elevation caribou, moose, wolverine, and grizzly bear. It is recognized by the province as an area traditionally used by First Nations people. Its topography has examples of Karst topography and alpine areas.

It was created as Provincial Park in June 2000, with additional area added in 2001. The park can be used for fishing, canoeing, hunting, horseback riding, and wildlife viewing. Motorized vehicles (ATV, snowmobiles) are permitted on designated trails.

References

British Columbia. Ministry of Employment and Investment (March 1999). Dawson Creek Land & Resource Management Plan, p.42.
Ministry of Environment

External links

Regional District of Fraser-Fort George
Peace River Regional District
Provincial parks of British Columbia
2000 establishments in British Columbia
Protected areas established in 2000